David Shikami Kwalimwa is a Kenyan multimedia sports journalist who currently works for the Nation Media Group. He previously worked at Sports TV in Uganda, K24 TV, Kiss TV as a sports producer and as a reporter for Goal.

Awards 
He was named the television presenter of the year at the Footballer of the Year Awards (FOYA) at the 2011 KPL Awards.

References

External links
David Kwalimwa at Muck Ruck
David Kwalimwa at The East African

1983 births
Living people
Kenyan journalists
Kenyan producers
Kenyan television journalists
Kenyan television presenters